IBC is an initialism that can stand for:

Broadcasting
Intercontinental Broadcasting Corporation, Channel 13, Philippines
International Beacon Project, Worldwide network of radio propagation beacons
International Broadcast Centre
International Broadcasting Company, created by Leonard Plugge
IBC Studios, the studios for the above
International Broadcasting Convention, an annual media, entertainment and technology show
Inuit Broadcasting Corporation, Canada
Iwate Broadcasting Company, Japan

Business
IBC Airways, an American airline company
IBC (bus manufacturer), a former Australian bus manufacturer
IBC Vehicles, Isuzu Bedford Company
Índice Bursátil de Capitalización, a stock market index in Venezuela
Institute of Business Consulting, UK
Insolvency and Bankruptcy Code, 2016, India
International Bank of Commerce, Texas, United States
International Biographical Centre, a publisher
International Boxing Club of New York
International Building Code, used in most of the US
International business company (or corporation)
Interstate Bakeries Corporation
Intertemporal budget constraint, a budgeting term

Religion
Indiana Bible College, USA
International Bahá'í Council
International Buddhist College, Thailand
International Old Catholic Bishops' Conference, or International Bishops' Conference
Irish Baptist College, Republic of Ireland
Isaac Breuer College of Hebraic Studies, Israel
Irish Baptist College, Republic of Ireland
 International Buddhist Confederation, Republic of India

Other uses
IBC Root Beer
Indirect Branch Control, information returned by the CPUID instruction for the Intel Pentium and successors
Inflammatory breast cancer
Information-based complexity
Intermediate Bulk Container, industrial-grade containers engineered for the mass handling, transport, and storage of materials
International Botanical Congress
 International Boundary Commission
International Boxing Council
International branch campus
Iran Bioinformatics Center, Iran
Iraq Body Count project
Italy. Common Good (Italia. Bene Comune), Italian political coalition